The Find Handicap is an American Thoroughbred horse race run annually at Maryland's Laurel Park Racecourse. It is open to horses ages three and older and is contested on turf over a distance of one and one eighth miles.

The race is named in honor of Find, who ranked as Maryland's all-time money winner from 1950 through 1982, when he was surpassed by Jameela. Find was a durable gelding owned by Alfred Gwynne Vanderbilt who earned $803,615 over eight years racing. He started in 110 races, winning 22 times with 27 seconds and 27 third-place finishes. He won or placed in 51 stakes races.

Find was born and raised at venerable Sagamore Farm in Glyndon, Maryland. He was born in the same foal crop of 1950 at Sagamore that produced Vanderbilt-bred stakes winners Native Dancer and Social Outcast. Find was retired from racing and pensioned at Sagamore Farm, where he lived out his days as a companion for the farm's barren and maiden mares until his death in 1979 at the age of 29.

The race was inaugurated and run for the seven times at Maryland State Fair from 1978 through 1984 at only  furlongs on the main dirt track. The race was also taken off the turf in 1993, 1994, 2000 and 2004 due to the condition of the turf as a result of inclement weather.

Records 

Speed record: 
  miles - 1:46.00 - Le Reine's Terms   (2002) 
  furlongs - 1:17.00 - Happy Chef   (1984)

Most wins by a jockey:
 3 - Mario Pino    (1988, 1999 & 2005)
 3 - Heratio A. Karamanos    (2002, 2003 & 2006)

Most wins by a trainer:
 5 - Lawrence E. Murray    (1993, 2001, 2002, 2003 & 2004)

Winners of the Find Handicap since 1978

See also 

 Laurel Park Racecourse

References

External links
 Laurel Park website

Laurel Park Racecourse
Horse races in Maryland
Recurring sporting events established in 1978
1978 establishments in Maryland